Sir Alexander Walden (died 1401), of Matching and Rickling, Essex, was an English politician.

Life
Walden was the son of Alexander Walden and the nephew of the MP, Humphrey Walden. He married Elizabeth Somery, the daughter and heiress of John Somery of Bygrave, Hertfordshire. His second wife was Juliana.

Career
Walden was knighted by 1372. He was a member of parliament for Essex in September 1388 and November 1390.

References

Year of birth missing
1401 deaths
14th-century births
English MPs September 1388
People from Epping Forest District
English knights
People from Uttlesford (district)
English MPs November 1390